The Rotterdam Design Award (Rotterdamse Designprijs) was an annual and later biennial design award in the Netherlands from 1993 to 2013. In the first five editions the work of the nominees were exhibited in the Kunsthal, and afterwards in Museum Boijmans Van Beuningen. The winners were selected by an international jury during this exhibition, and were announced at the end of the exhibition. The winners received an amount of € 20,000, which could be spent freely.

History 
The prize was organized annually from 1993 to 1997, after which it became a biennial prize. No edition took place in 2005.

In the first years the prize was awarded to individual products of designers, architects and other participants in the field of design. Since 2007 the conceptual vision and performance in the field of the designer became its mayor criterion. 

The awarded was inaugurated by the Rotterdamse Kunststichting, where Christine de Baan was director of the Rotterdam Design Prize from 1993 tot 2000. In 2007 Thimo te Duits & Gerard Forde managed the award and wrote the catalog. Towards the end in 2011 the Rotterdam design prize was organized by Stichting Designprijs Rotterdam, Museum Boijmans Van Beuningen and Premsela, Dutch Institute for Design and Fashion.

Award winners 1993–2013

See also 
 Dutch Design Awards
 Dutch Furniture Awards

Selected publications 
 Thimo te Duits & Gerard Forde, Designprijs Rotterdam 2007, Rotterdam : Stichting Designprijs, 2007.

References 

Design awards
Dutch awards
Dutch design
1993 establishments in the Netherlands
Awards established in 1993